Arthur S. Komori (1915-2000) was a Japanese-American who served as a spy for the United States in Pre-war Philippines.

Service
Eight months before the Attack on Pearl Harbor, Arthur Komori was recruited by American military intelligence while attending the University of Hawaii. He enlisted in the Corps of Intelligence Police of the United States Army on 13 March 1941. On 22 April 1941, he was sent to the Philippines to gather intelligence. He was relieved of his assignment following the outbreak of World War II. 
He fled to Australia following the Fall of Bataan. He continued to serve in U.S intelligence in Australia, and rose to the rank of Chief Warrant Officer. Following the end of the war, he was stationed in Japan.

After the War
He served as an attorney and formerly served as a District Court judge. By November 20, 1999, he had been diagnosed with senile dementia and Alzheimer's. Komori, died in Wilcox Hospital in 2000 at the age of 84. He is survived by his wife, Rosa, daughter Rosemary Gardner, brother David, sisters Aiko Hirai, Mary Setlak, Martha Yasue and Viola Imai, and two grandchildren.

Recognition
Komori was awarded the Bronze Star in December 1945. In 1988 he was elected to the Military Intelligence Hall of Fame at Fort Huachuca, Ariz.

Further reading

References

1915 births
2000 deaths
American military personnel of Japanese descent
United States Army personnel of World War II
World War II spies for the United States
University of Hawaiʻi alumni
University of Baltimore School of Law alumni
United States Army officers